Tim George (born October 4, 1951) is a former American football player. He played college football at Carson–Newman College in Tennessee before being drafted by the Cincinnati Bengals in 1973; he played for two seasons in the National Football League (NFL), for the Bengals and the Cleveland Browns, before spending several seasons in the World Football League (WFL).

Career
Born in Alcoa, Tennessee, George, a graduate of Alcoa High School, became a star wide receiver at Carson–Newman College, where he helped the team reach the 1972 National Association of Intercollegiate Athletics championship game; Carson–Newman lost the championship to East Texas State by a score of 21–18, however George was named the game's Most Valuable Player.

Following his college career, George was selected by the Cincinnati Bengals of the National Football League, using the 16th pick of the third round in the 1973 NFL Draft. George would appear in twelve games for the Bengals during the 1973 season; he finished the year credited with two receptions for a total of 28 yards gained. Released from the team after the 1973 season, George signed with the Cleveland Browns for 1974, appearing in eight games but not having any receptions over the course of the year. George was cut by the Browns before the start of the 1975 football season. Following his release from the Browns, George moved to the World Football League, where he played for teams in Philadelphia and Charlotte for several seasons.

George was inducted into the Carson–Newman Athletic Hall of Fame in 2007 and the Blount County Sports Hall of Fame in 2008.

References
Citations

Bibliography

 
 

Living people
1951 births
People from Alcoa, Tennessee
Players of American football from Tennessee
Carson–Newman Eagles football players
Cincinnati Bengals players
Cleveland Browns players
Charlotte Hornets (WFL) players
Philadelphia Bell players
American football wide receivers